Holme railway station may refer to:

Holme railway station (Cambridgeshire)
Holme railway station (Lancashire)
Holme railway station (Norfolk)